Achyra is a village in the Medeon municipal unit, Aetolia-Acarnania, Greece. Its population at the 2011 census was 117. It was originally situated on a mountain slope, 7 km west of Katouna, 13 km east of Palairos and 37 km northwest of Agrinio but at some point in the 20th century a landslide took away part of the village and it was subsequently moved to its present location on the outskirts of Katouna.

Population

See also

List of settlements in Aetolia-Acarnania

References

External links
Achyra at the GTP Travel Pages

Populated places in Aetolia-Acarnania